The Wofford Terriers baseball team is a varsity intercollegiate athletic team of Wofford College in Spartanburg, South Carolina, United States. The team is a member of the Southern Conference, which is part of the National Collegiate Athletic Association's Division I. Wofford's first baseball team was fielded in 1889. The team plays its home games at Russell C. King Field in Spartanburg, South Carolina. The Terriers are coached by Todd Interdonato.

Major League Baseball
Wofford has had 12 Major League Baseball Draft selections since the draft began in 1965.

See also
List of NCAA Division I baseball programs

References

External links
 

 
Baseball teams established in 1889
1889 establishments in South Carolina